Catharina "Tini" Wilhelmina Wagner (17 December 1919, Amsterdam – 2 June 2004, Soest) was a freestyle swimmer from the Netherlands, who represented her native country at the 1936 Summer Olympics in Berlin, Germany.

In 1936 she won the gold medal in the 4 × 100 m freestyle relay, alongside Willy den Ouden, Rie Mastenbroek and Jopie Selbach. In the 100 m freestyle competition she finished fifth and in the 400 m freestyle event she finished seventh.

External links
 Tini Wagner's profile at the Dutch Olympic Committee  
 

1919 births
2004 deaths
Dutch female freestyle swimmers
Olympic swimmers of the Netherlands
Swimmers at the 1936 Summer Olympics
Olympic gold medalists for the Netherlands
Swimmers from Amsterdam
World record setters in swimming
Medalists at the 1936 Summer Olympics
Olympic gold medalists in swimming
20th-century Dutch women